First Presbyterian Church, also known as the Calvary Temple Evangelical Church, is a historic church at 946 Market Street in Parkersburg, Wood County, West Virginia. It was built in 1894, and is a two-story, brick and stone church building in a combined Romanesque / Gothic Revival style.  It features a corner bell tower.

It was listed on the National Register of Historic Places in 1982, and it is a contributing property to the Avery Street Historic District, which was designated and listed on the National Register in 1986.

References

External links

Buildings and structures in Parkersburg, West Virginia
Churches on the National Register of Historic Places in West Virginia
Presbyterian churches in West Virginia
Gothic Revival church buildings in West Virginia
Churches completed in 1894
19th-century Presbyterian church buildings in the United States
Churches in Wood County, West Virginia
National Register of Historic Places in Wood County, West Virginia
Individually listed contributing properties to historic districts on the National Register in West Virginia